Skam may refer to:

 Skam TV franchise, based on the Norwegian TV show Skam (TV series)
 Skam (TV series), a Norwegian 2015–2017 TV series
 SKAM Austin, 2018-2019 US adaptation
 Skam España, 2018-2020 Spanish adaptation
 wtFOCK, 2018-2021 Flemish adaptation
 Skam France (aka Skam Belgique, also stylized as "SKAM"), 2018–2022 France-Belgium adaptation
 Druck (TV series), 2018-present German adaptation
 "Skam" (song), 2001 song by Nanne Grönvall off the album Alla mina ansikten
 Skam Records, an English record label
 Amalfi Airport (Colombia) (ICAO airport code SKAM), Amalfi, Antioquia Department, Colombia

See also

 Scam (disambiguation)